Saint-Germain-sur-Sèves is a commune in the Manche department in Normandy in north-western France.

History
Prior to Operation Cobra in World War II, it was an impediment, a small island in a stretch of a marshy area. The position was held by a kampfgruppe of the Das Reich Division and the 6th Parachutist Regiment (Fallschirm-Jäger-Regiment 6). The 358th Regiment of the 90th Infantry Division under General Eugene M. Landrum started the attack on 22 July, but without air support because of bad weather. The 1st Battalion suffered heavy losses but held on to the island. The 2nd battalion failed to cross the marshes. In the evening the German Fallschirmjäger with company leader Alexander Uhlig counterattacked with one tank of the 2nd Panzer Regiment. The Americans were driven back, in one hour they had suffered losses of 100 soldiers killed, 400 wounded, and 250 prisoners. Saint-Germain-Sur-Sèves was liberated a few days later in the same operation.

See also
Communes of the Manche department

References

Saintgermainsurseves